Maxime Janvier (born 18 October 1996) is a French tennis player.

Janvier has a career high ATP singles ranking of 170 achieved on 30 September 2019. He also has a career high doubles ranking of 297 achieved on 18 October 2021. Janvier has won 1 ATP Challenger singles title at the 2016 Morocco Tennis Tour – Casablanca II.

He was awarded a wildcard to the 2018 French Open, the 2019 French Open and the 2020 French Open.

Challenger and Futures finals

Singles: 14 (8–6)

Doubles: 9 (6–3)

References

External links
 
 

1996 births
Living people
French male tennis players
People from Creil
Sportspeople from Oise